Lucania was an ancient area of southern Italy.

Lucania may also refer to:
 Lucania (film)
 Lucania (theme), a Byzantine province
 Lucania (fish), a genus of freshwater fish in the family Fundulidae
 Lucky Luciano, mobster, born as Salvatore Lucania
 Mount Lucania in Canada
 RMS Lucania, an ocean liner operated by Cunard 1893–1909.
 SS Lucania, an Italian passenger ship that served as HMCS Prince Robert during World War II
 British Rail Class 40, a type of British railway diesel electric locomotive

See also
 Basilicata, an Italian region sometimes known as Lucania